Joaquín García Benavides (born June 5, 1962) is a Costa Rican slalom canoer who competed in the early 1990s. He finished 41st in the K-1 event at the 1992 Summer Olympics in Barcelona.

References
Sports-Reference.com profile

1962 births
Canoeists at the 1992 Summer Olympics
Costa Rican male canoeists
Living people
Olympic canoeists of Costa Rica
Place of birth missing (living people)
20th-century Costa Rican people